The Honda RC100 (also known as Honda RC-F1 1.0X, chassis number RC1-203/1) was a prototype Formula One car built by engineers from Honda R&D Center, Tochigi, although not as an official project of Honda.  The car was completed in 1993 and initially tested at Honda's Suzuka Circuit. Two more cars, known as RC101 (RC-F1 1.5X, chassis RC1B-101) and RC101B (RC-F1 2.0X, chassis RC2-001), were also built and tested before the project ended.

These cars should not be confused with the Honda RA099, which was an official Honda prototype intended for the 1999 season but also never ran.

History
During the 1992 season, Honda announced that they would end their engine supply programme that had existed since 1984.  This was due to Honda's desire for a new challenge after dominating in Formula One, with Honda deciding to move to the CART championship in North America (although their tuning partner Mugen Motorsports would continue carrying Honda's presence in the sport until they returned in 2000).

However, engineers at Honda decided to launch their own separate project by attempting to build a full Formula One car, something Honda had not done since the 1960s. Honda at the time encouraged engineers to create their own projects in an attempt to motivate and boost morale.  Funds from Honda's motorsports budget were specifically put aside each year for engineers to be able to realistically create these projects.  These projects were however not backed by Honda Motor Company, and the engineers actually had to work on their personal projects on their own time.

1991: RC-F1 1.0X (RC100)
In the early 1990s, to study how a Formula One chassis works, the mass-produced car engineers of the Honda Automobile R&D Center, Tochigi, started to design a Formula One chassis as a volunteer activity outside of working hours. By late 1991, the engineers was able to obtain and rebuild an used 1991 Honda Formula One engine, the RA121E, as used in the McLaren MP4/6.

When the RC100/RC-F1 1.0X was tested, the engineers were satisfied with the performance of the monocoque and suspension at the test, but not with the aerodynamics of the chassis when tested in their wind tunnel, prompting the development of the next car. The RC100 was painted white, and nicknamed the "white crow" by the Honda R&D engineers.

1992: RC-F1 1.5X (RC101)
Members of Honda R&D Center's chassis design team decided to give another try at building another Formula One chassis, attempting to fully comply with the  Formula One regulations and solving aerodynamic problems of the previous car. The car used the same Honda RA122E/B V12 engine that was being used in Honda's engine supply program in 1992 and a six speed semi-automatic transmission built by Honda, mirroring the McLaren Honda MP4/7A.

While the car was still being completed in 1992, Honda Motor Company president Nobuhiko Kawamoto acknowledged that the project existed, although it was confirmed to have had no backing from Honda. The completed RC101/RC-F1 1.5X was unveiled to select media in February 1993. Later that year, Honda engineers had the car crash tested by FISA in order to confirm that it indeed complied with the 1993 regulations; this necessitated the destruction of the original car.

The first public testing came at Suzuka in January 1994, when yet another car had been built and Satoru Nakajima performing the public test. Soon after, testing on the RC101 came to an end as Honda concentrated on their new CART program.

1994: RC-F1 2.0X (RC101B)

Following rule changes necessitated by safety concerns following the deaths at 1994 San Marino Grand Prix, a third Honda R&D Formula One car was later built, based on  regulations. The RC101B/RC-F1 2.0X featured new developments such as stepped bottom and a raised nose cone, and used a 3.0 liter Mugen-Honda engine as well as grooved Japanese Formula 3000-spec Bridgestone tyres.

Aftermath
The RC100, RC101 and RC101B were planned to be destroyed after a demonstration running at the 2001 Honda Festival, an annual social gathering of Honda companies, in Honda Automobile R&D Center, Tochigi; it was the first time the cars were presented following the tests. Ultimately, the RC100 was presented to Honda Technical College Kansai and the latter two cars are now shown at the Honda Collection Hall, located at Twin Ring Motegi.

References

External links

Story of RC100 at Forix
General Honda F1 car information, including RC100
Honda Automobile R&D Center, Tochigi - The developer of the RC100 series.

Honda Formula One cars
Formula One cars that never raced